Rahma Haruna (c. 1996–1997 – 25 December 2016) was a 19-year old Nigerian teenager who became famous for a viral photo taken by photographer Sani Maikatanga.

Life
Haruna was born some time between 1996 and 1997, in Nigeria. At the age of six months, Haruna's legs and arms stopped growing except for one of her arms. She was the victim of an unknown disease that left her disabled, unable to do basic tasks such as walking, crawling or even handling most items. Because of excessive pain in her extremities, she had to remain inside a plastic bucket. Shortly after the photo went viral, an anonymous person donated a wheelchair to ease her transport. Haruna's parents affirmed having spent about 1 million naira in treatment (US$2,737.89); however, she did not recover. She died of unknown causes on 25 December 2016, at age 19 in Kano, Nigeria. Haruna is survived by her parents and brothers.

References

1990s births
2016 deaths
21st-century Nigerian women
Nigerian people with disabilities